James Sinclair Taylor McGowen (16 August 1855 – 7 April 1922) was an Australian politician. He served as premier of New South Wales from 1910 to 1913, the first member of the Australian Labor Party (ALP) to hold the position, and was a key figure in the party's early history in New South Wales.

McGowen was born at sea to English immigrants. He was a boilermaker by profession and soon became involved in the labour movement, becoming president of the Sydney Trades Hall in 1888. McGowen was elected to the New South Wales Legislative Assembly at the 1891 general election under the auspices of the Labor Electoral League. He succeeded as party leader in 1894 and retained the position following Federation in 1901. He became leader of the opposition after the 1904 election and led the ALP to majority government in 1910. As premier, McGowen oversaw progressive reforms. He was succeeded by his deputy William Holman in 1913 and expelled from the ALP following the 1916 split over conscription. He finished his career as a Nationalist appointee to the New South Wales Legislative Council.

Early life and family
McGowen was the son of James McGowen, a boilermaker, and his wife Eliza Ditchfield, immigrants from Lancashire and was born at sea, on the "Western Bride", on the way to Melbourne. His father worked building in bridges, initially in Victoria, and later in New South Wales. After limited schooling he was apprenticed as a boiler maker in 1870. He became a member of the United Society of Boilermakers and Iron Shipbuilders of New South Wales on its establishment in 1873, he became secretary in 1874. He entered the railways department and in 1888 was elected president of the executive of Trades Hall committee. He worked hard and successfully to raise funds to build the Trades Hall at Sydney.

McGowen married Emily Towner in 1878 in Redfern, Sydney.

Political career 
In 1891, the New South Wales Trades and Labour Council established the Labor Electoral League, which developed into Labor Party, and McGowen stood for election to the New South Wales Legislative Assembly seat of Redfern and was one of 35 Labor candidates to win and the most experienced unionist. He held the seat continuously to 1917.

The first Labor parliamentarians in New South Wales were almost as fractious as their fellow parliamentarians from the other parties.  McGowen was one of three legislators to sign the "pledge" to abide by party discipline. Thanks to his increasing skill as a parliamentarian, his effective public speaking, and his relative seniority, he became Labor's parliamentary leader in 1894. George Reid's Free Trade Government was dependent on Labor's support. With their support, Reid reduced tariffs, introduced income tax, and eliminated the property qualification for membership of the Legislative Council. McGowan led Labor in its opposition to the Federation Bill produced by the Australasian Constitutional Convention. The party opposed the proposed Constitution on the grounds it was undemocratic. McGowen strongly favoured retaining appeals to the Privy Council from the High Court, but stressed this was his personal view. Labor reconciled itself to the Constitution once it had been approved in referendums across Australia in 1899. McGowen stood for the Federal seat of South Sydney in 1901, but was narrowly defeated.

In December 1907, McGowan and the Labor Party—whose policy preference was nationalisation of the iron and steel industry—moved a last minute amendment that, when carried, led indirectly to the collapse of William Sandford Limited, owners of the Eskbank Ironworks at Lithgow.

Premier

McGowen's honesty and judiciousness were reassuring to the public, and were major factors in Labor's 1910 election win. He remained Premier until 1913, but was not an effective director of the parliamentary party, preferring to leave most issues of party management to his deputy, William Holman. As well as being Premier, he was also Treasurer during most of 1911 and Chief Secretary from December 1911.

In 1913, while Holman was in England, McGowen attempted to settle a gas workers' strike by threatening to dismiss the strikers and to hire non-union workers in their stead. This threat antagonised most of the state ALP, and when Holman returned to Australia in June 1913, he organised McGowen's overthrow. McGowen became Minister for Labour and Industry in Holman's first cabinet, holding this post until January 1914.

The McGowen government carried out an active policy of subsidising hospitals and dispensaries in order to bring about the realisation of universal health care system. Nevertheless, opposition by doctors to state control forced the government to concentrate on financing new and existing institutions, such as nursing services for remote bush districts, while Friendly Societies were financially supported and membership encouraged. As a result, improved low-cost medical services were made widely available throughout New South Wales. In addition, public works were expanded, and important educational reforms were enacted, together with reforms in electoral law, income tax, arbitration, and housing for workers.

The Theatres and Public Halls Act 1912 implemented censorship of films deemed obscene, implementing the so-called bushranger ban.

Later life
Three of McGowen's sons served in the Great War; one of them was killed at Gallipoli in 1915. McGowen remained a strong supporter of Australia's involvement in the war. The 1916 Labor conference decided to oppose conscription. McGowen, who favoured conscription, was expelled from the party along with many other ALP parliamentarians.

At the 1917 election McGowen was defeated by the official Labor candidate William McKell (himself a future Premier), but his career did not end there. His old rival Holman, now himself an apostate from the ALP and leading a Nationalist administration, appointed McGowen to the then unelected Legislative Council in July 1917.

McGowen died of heart disease in the Sydney suburb of Petersham and was survived by his wife, five of their seven sons, and two daughters. A large crowd attended his funeral at St Paul's Church, Redfern, New South Wales on 8 April 1922; he was buried at Rookwood Cemetery.

Speeches 

 Policy speech 1910.

References

 

1855 births
1922 deaths
People born at sea
Australian people of Scottish descent
Members of the New South Wales Legislative Assembly
Leaders of the Opposition in New South Wales
Premiers of New South Wales
Treasurers of New South Wales
Australian Labor Party members of the Parliament of New South Wales
Members of the New South Wales Legislative Council
Australian boilermakers